Loutit is a surname. Notable people with the surname include:

Blythe Loutit (1940–2005), South African illustrator
Isobel Loutit (1909–2009), Canadian statistician
Jessie Loutit (born 1988), Canadian rower
John Freeman Loutit (1910–1992), Australian haematologist and radiobiologist
Margaret Loutit (1929–2020), New Zealand microbiologist

See also
Louttit, a related surname